No Escape may refer to:

Film and television
 No Escape (1934 film), a British drama
 I Escaped from the Gestapo, a 1943 American drama also known as No Escape
 No Escape (1936 film), a British thriller
 No Escape (1953 film), an American film noir
 No Escape (1994 film), an American science-fiction film
 No Escape (2015 film), an American action thriller film
 No Escape (2020 film), an American horror film
 Quicksand: No Escape, a 1992 American thriller television film
 Tidal Wave: No Escape, a 1997 American television film
 No Escape: Male Rape in U.S. Prisons, a 2001 report by Human Rights Watch on prison rape in the United States
 WWE No Escape, the German name for the WWE Elimination Chamber pay-per-view

Music
 No Escape (album), a 1979 album by the Marc Tanner Band
 "No Escape", a 2012 song by Coldrain from Through Clarity

Games
 No Escape (video game), a 1994 platform game for Sega Genesis
 No Escape, a 2000 Windows video game from Funcom
 No Escape!, a 1983 Atari 2600 video game from Imagic